Bunch is a surname. 
According to George Fraser Black (The Surnames of Scotland, 1946), it is "a surname peculiar to Perth and neighbourhood, and found in Perth so early as first half of the fifteenth century".

Surname
Notable people with the surname include:

Arthur Bunch (1909–1973), football player
Carl Bunch (1939–2011), American musician
Charles Bunch (born 1950), American businessman
Charlotte Bunch (born 1944), American feminist author
Chris Bunch (1943–2005), American science fiction and television writer
David R. Bunch, American writer of short stories and poetry
Dewayne Bunch (disambiguation), multiple people
Greg Bunch (born 1956), retired American basketball player
Jarrod Bunch (born 1968), former American football player and actor
Jim Bunch (born 1956), American football player and businessman
Jimmy Bunch (born 1956), Bluegrass Banjo Player
John Bunch (1921–2010), American jazz pianist
Jon Bunch (1970–2016), American rock singer and songwriter
Kenji Bunch (born 1973), American violist and composer
Kenneth Cecil Bunch (1919–1942), United States Naval Aviator
Lonnie Bunch (born 1952), American educator and historian
Madeline Bunch, American entrepreneur from Santa Rosa, California
Melvin Bunch (born 1971), former Major League Baseball pitcher
Pat Bunch, American country music songwriter
Regina Bunch (born 1962), American educator and politician
Samuel Bunch (1786–1849), American politician
Shawn Bunch (born 1983), American wrestler and mixed martial artist
Tyler Bunch (born 1970), American puppeteer, puppet designer, director, and actor
Walter Bunch (1872–1937), English professional footballer

Geographical distribution
At the time of the United Kingdom Census of 1881, the frequency of the surname Bunch was highest in the following counties, by order of frequency:

 1. Hampshire (1: 6,807)
 2. Angus (1: 6,940)
 3. Staffordshire (1: 13,367)
 4. Warwickshire (1: 15,820)
 5. Essex (1: 30,338)
 6. Middlesex (1: 33,583)
 7. Hertfordshire (1: 40,344)
 8. Kent (1: 41,564)
 9. Worcestershire (1: 42,350)
 10. Lincolnshire (1: 42,514)

As of 2014, the frequency of the surname was highest in the following countries:

 1. Anguilla (1: 6,726)
 2. The Bahamas (1: 10,042)
 3. United States (1: 12,781)
 4. Denmark (1: 31,863)
 5. Scotland (1: 42,400)
 6. England (1: 74,896)
 7. Australia (1: 94,643)
 8. Canada (1: 159,583)
 9. Colombia (1: 170,450)
 10. New Zealand (1: 216,512)

As of 2014, 90.9% of all known bearers of the surname Bunch were residents of the United States. The frequency of the surname was higher than the national average in the following states:

 1. Tennessee (1: 3,206)
 2. Kentucky (1: 3,387)
 3. Arkansas (1: 4,744)
 4. Missouri (1: 5,264)
 5. Oklahoma (1: 5,271)
 6. Mississippi (1: 5,508)
 7. Indiana (1: 5,782)
 8. North Carolina (1: 5,981)
 9. South Carolina (1: 6,345)
 10. Georgia (1: 7,832)
 11. Virginia (1: 8,003)
 12. Alaska (1: 8,409)
 13. Louisiana (1: 9,551)
 14. Nevada (1: 9,569)
 15. Oregon (1: 9,822)
 16. Alabama (1: 10,430)
 17. Idaho (1: 11,168)
 18. Texas (1: 11,626)
 19. Kansas (1: 11,809)
 20. West Virginia (1: 12,068)
 21. New Mexico (1: 12,696)

The frequency of the surname was highest (over 20 times the national average) in the following U.S. counties:

 1. Chowan County, N.C. (1: 77)
 2. Morgan County, Tenn. (1: 133)
 3. Wayne County, Miss. (1: 173)
 4. Russell County, Ky. (1: 250)
 5. Wilkes County, Ga. (1: 271)
 6. Whitley County, Ky. (1: 277)
 7. Adair County, Okla. (1: 277)
 8. Bertie County, N.C. (1: 279)
 9. Lewis County, Tenn. (1: 299)
 10. Perquimans County, N.C. (1: 302)
 11. Metcalfe County, Ky. (1: 312)
 12. Hancock County, Tenn. (1: 318)
 13. Barren County, Ky. (1: 321)
 14. Ellsworth County, Kan. (1: 337)
 15. Anderson County, Tenn. (1: 343)
 16. Bamberg County, S.C. (1: 386)
 17. Claiborne County, Tenn. (1: 445)
 18. Rush County, Kan. (1: 455)
 19. Adair County, Mo. (1: 457)
 20. Wayne County, Tenn. (1: 458)
 21. Roane County, Tenn. (1: 461)
 22. Fayette County, Ind. (1: 468)
 23. Perry County, Tenn. (1: 492)
 24. Gordon County, Ga. (1: 502)
 25. Hamblen County, Tenn. (1: 505)
 26. Hertford County, N.C. (1: 509)
 27. Ohio County, Ky. (1: 533)
 28. Adair County, Ky. (1: 535)
 29. Meigs County, Tenn. (1: 555)
 30. Campbell County, Tenn. (1: 559)
 31. Howell County, Mo. (1: 585)
 32. Baker County, Ore. (1: 593)
 33. Lander County, Nev. (1: 603)
 34. Gates County, N.C. (1: 613)

References

See also
 Bunche, another surname